Vladislav Borisenko (born 5 March 1997) is a Belarusian professional footballer who plays for Vertikal Kalinkovichi.

References

External links 
 
 
 Profile at Dinamo Minsk website

1997 births
Living people
Belarusian footballers
Association football defenders
FC Dinamo Minsk players
FC Slavia Mozyr players
FC Naftan Novopolotsk players
FC Lida players
FC Chist players
FC Slonim-2017 players
FC Granit Mikashevichi players
FC Vertikal Kalinkovichi players